576i is a standard-definition digital video mode, originally used for digitizing analog television in most countries of the world where the utility frequency for electric power distribution is 50 Hz. Because of its close association with the legacy color encoding systems, it is often referred to as PAL, PAL/SECAM or SECAM when compared to its 60 Hz (typically, see PAL-M) NTSC-colour-encoded counterpart, 480i.

The 576 identifies a vertical resolution of 576 lines, and the i identifies it as an interlaced resolution. The field rate, which is 50 Hz, is sometimes included when identifying the video mode, i.e. 576i50; another notation, endorsed by both the International Telecommunication Union in BT.601 and SMPTE in SMPTE 259M, includes the frame rate, as in 576i/25.

Operation

In analogue television, the full raster uses 625 lines, with 49 lines having no image content to allow time for cathode ray tube circuits to retrace for the next frame (see Vertical blanking interval),. These non-displayed lines can be used to transmit teletext or other services. In the digital domain, only the visible 576 lines are considered.

Analogue television signals have no pixels; they are continuous along rastered scan lines, but limited by the available bandwidth. The maximal baseband bandwidth is around 6 MHz which, according to the sampling theorem, translates to about 720 pixels. This value is enough to capture all the original information present. In digital applications, the number of pixels per line is an arbitrary choice. Values above about 500 pixels per line are enough for a perceived quality equivalent to analog free-to-air television; DVB-T, DVD and DV allow better values such as 704 or 720 (matching the maximum theoretical resolution of the original analog system).

Color information is stored using the YCbCr color space (regardless of the original PAL or SECAM color system) with 4:2:2 sampling and following Rec. 601 colorimetry.

Usage
Originally used for conversion of analog sources in TV studios, this resolution was adopted into digital broadcasting or home use.
In digital video applications, such as DVDs and digital broadcasting, colour encoding is no longer significant; in that context, 576i means only
 576 frame lines
 25 frames or 50 fields per second
 Interlaced video
 PCM audio (baseband)

The 576i video format can be transported by major digital television formats, ATSC, DVB and ISDB, and on DVD, and it supports aspect ratios of standard 4:3 and anamorphic 16:9.

Progressive sources
When 576i is used to transmit content that was originally composed of 25 full progressive frames per second (576p25 or 576p/25), the odd field of the frame is transmitted first (this is the opposite to 480i). Systems which recover progressive frames or transcode video should ensure that this field order is obeyed, otherwise the recovered frame will consist of a field from one frame and a field from an adjacent frame, resulting in 'comb' interlacing artifacts. Such progressive content can be marked using encoding flags, for example in DVDs or other MPEG2 based media.

PAL speed-up

Motion pictures are typically shot on film at 24 frames per second. When telecined and played back at PAL's standard of 25 frames per second, films run about 4% faster. This also applies to most TV series that are shot on film or digital 24p. Unlike NTSC's telecine system, which uses 3:2 pulldown to convert the 24 frames per second to the 30 fps frame rate, PAL speed-up results in the telecined video running 4% shorter than the original film as well as the equivalent NTSC telecined video.

Depending on the sound system in use, it also slightly increases the pitch of the soundtrack by 70.67 cents (0.7067 of a semitone). More recently, digital conversion methods have used algorithms that preserve the original pitch of the soundtrack, although the frame rate conversion still results in faster playback.

Conversion methods exist that can convert 24 frames per second video to 25 frames per second with no speed increase, however image quality suffers when conversions of this type are used. This method is most commonly employed through conversions done digitally (i.e. using a computer and software like VirtualDub), and is employed in situations where the importance of preserving the speed of the video outweighs the need for image quality.

Many movie enthusiasts prefer PAL over NTSC despite the former's speed-up, because the latter results in telecine judder, a visual distortion not present in PAL sped-up video. DVDLard states "the majority of authorities on the subject favour PAL over NTSC for DVD playback quality". Also DVD reviewers often make mention of this cause. For example, in his PAL vs. NTSC article, the founder of  MichaelDVD says: "Personally, I find [3:2 pulldown] all but intolerable and find it very hard to watch a movie on an NTSC DVD because of it." In the DVD review of Frequency, one of his reviewers mentions: "because of the 3:2 pull-down artefacts that are associated with the NTSC format (…) I prefer PAL pretty much any day of the week". This is not an issue on modern upconverting DVD players and personal computers, as they play back 23.97 frame/s–encoded video at its true frame rate, without 3:2 pulldown.

PAL speed-up does not occur on native 25 fps video, such as British or European TV-series or movies that are shot on video instead of film.

Software that corrects the speed-up is available for those viewing 576i DVD films on their computers, WinDVD's PAL TruSpeed being the most ubiquitous. However, this method involves resampling the soundtrack, which results in a slight decrease in audio quality. There is also a DirectShow Filter for Windows called ReClock developed by RedFox (formerly SlySoft) that can be used in a custom DirectShow Graph to remap the reference audio timing clock to correct the clock timing skew using an accurate self-adaptive algorithm resulting in effective removal of judder during panning caused by Euro pulldown including audio pitch correction via time-stretching with WASAPI Exclusive Mode and SPDIF AC/3 Encoding output modes.

See also

 List of common resolutions
 4320p, 2160p, 1080p, 1080i, 720p, 576p, 480p, 480i, 360p, 240p
Standard-definition television
405-line television system

References

Video formats
Television technology